This is a list of dialing codes by town in Montenegro.

History

Until Montenegro gained independence from Serbia and Montenegro, the nation was accessed through the international dialing code +381. The new dialing code +382 was introduced after independence and the two codes were used in parallel until February 2007, when +382 nominally became the only acceptable code. As of 1 October 2007, +381 is used only for Serbia and +382 is the only acceptable code for Montenegro.

Dialing codes

Fixed telephony
Area codes have two digits after the initial '0' trunk prefix, and local numbers have six digits. The trunk prefix is omitted when calling from abroad.

The following code prefixes are used for network groups.

The old codes were used in parallel with the new codes until 1 October 2008:

VoIP – Area code 78

Mobile telephony
60 – m:tel
63 – Telenor
66 – T-Mobile
67 – T-Mobile
68 – m:tel
69 – Telenor

Special codes
The following special telephone numbers are valid across the country:

New
112 – Emergency
122 – Police
123 – Fire brigade
124 – Ambulance
125 – Exact time
126 – Telegram sales over phone
127 – Telephone faults

Old
92 – Police
93 – Fire brigade
94 – Ambulance
95 – Exact time
96 – Telegram sales over phone
977 – Telephone faults
9802 – T-Com Montenegro dial-up number 
9811 – Sports results
9890 – Information on ISDN services
0 800 800 00 – Customer service

References

Dialing codes in Montenegro
Montenegro
Telecommunications in Montenegro